The Great Western Railway's 1813 Class was a series of 40  built at Swindon Works in two lots of 20 engines each. No. 1813 was sold to the Pembroke & Tenby Railway in May 1883 becoming No.7 Holmwood, retaining this name after being absorbed by the GWR. Nearly all of these engines spent their lives on the GWR's Southern Division.

Construction

Design
This was the first  design of William Dean and in its concept and dimensions may be regarded as the precursor of all the larger GWR pannier tanks of the 20th century, such as the 5700 and 9400 classes:
 Inside frames
 Wheels  diameter, wheelbase 
 Cylinders

Rebuilding
From 1894 some of the 1813s were rebuilt with saddle tanks, and between 1903 and 1906, six were rebuilt with either short or full-length pannier tanks, resulting in a very early example of this type of engine. The rest were so converted between 1911 and 1925, as had become standard practice on the Great Western. The class also carried an unusually wide variety of different boilers.

British Railways
No. 1835 alone passed into British Railways stock, to be withdrawn in January 1949.

References

1813
Steam locomotives of Great Britain
0-6-0T locomotives
Railway locomotives introduced in 1882
Standard gauge steam locomotives of Great Britain
Scrapped locomotives